Wiley Park Girls High School, (abbreviation WPGHS) is a public girls' government high school located in the Sydney suburb of Wiley Park, New South Wales, Australia. It is the sister school of Belmore Boys High School. Established in 1957, it is operated by the New South Wales Department of Education with girls from years 7 to 12.

Notable alumnae
Maggie Beer  – Chef, food author, restaurateur and food manufacturer
Irene Moss  – Former Race Discrimination Commissioner, NSW Ombudsman and ICAC Commissioner

References

Further reading

External links 
 Wiley Park Girls High School
 NSW Department of Education School Finder – Wiley Park Girls High School

Educational institutions established in 1957
1957 establishments in Australia
Girls' schools in New South Wales
Public high schools in Sydney